Hinko is a Croatian masculine given name. Notable people with this name include:

 Hinko Bauer (1908–1986), Croatian Jewish architect
 Hinko Hinković (1854–1929), Croatian lawyer, publisher and politician
 Hinko Juhn (1891–1940),  Croatian Jewish sculptor
 , Croatian Ustaše commander (Jasenovac concentration camp)
 Hinko Urbach (1872–1960), Zagreb Chief Rabbi
 Hinko Wurth, first president of the Yugoslav Tennis Association
 Diana Hinko (born 1943), Austrian pair skater

Croatian masculine given names